Fridays is a late-night live comedy show that aired on ABC on Friday nights from April 11, 1980, to April 23, 1982.

Overview

The program was ABC's attempt to duplicate the success of NBC's Saturday Night Live, which, at the time, was in its fifth and final season featuring the original "Not Ready for Primetime" cast, along with several writers (and SNL band leader at the time, Paul Shaffer) who had been promoted to feature player status, as well as newcomer Harry Shearer. Like SNL, Fridays featured popular musical guests and, beginning in the second season, celebrity guest hosts, some of whom had appeared on SNL before and after Fridays aired, such as Andy Kaufman, Billy Crystal, William Shatner, Mark Hamill, and George Carlin. (Carlin, who had hosted the very first SNL in 1975, was also Fridays first official "guest host" in 1981.)

The show featured many recurring characters and sketches, short films, and a parody news segment called Friday Edition, with Melanie Chartoff as the anchor (later joined by Rich Hall in seasons two and three). Veteran comedian Jack Burns served as show announcer and made on-screen appearances on the show. Initially, the show was compared unfavorably to Saturday Night Live as a weak clone that resorted to shock humor for laughs. The third episode (original airdate: April 25, 1980) was the last episode to air on some affiliates due to objectionable content concerning zombie gore and cannibalism ("Diner of the Living Dead"), disgusting habits ("Women Who Spit"), and blasphemous humor ("The Inflatable Nun").

When Saturday Night Lives sixth season was met with negative reviews and low ratings over the new cast, new writers, and new showrunner Jean Doumanian, critics who once panned Fridays praised it, citing the show as being sharper, edgier and funnier than Saturday Night Live at the time. Some critics attributed this to the sprawling, ambitious, and often pointed sociopolitical and situational sketches.

Some examples of this include:

A Bing Crosby-Bob Hope buddy comedy parody about the United States' dealings with El Salvador ("Road to El Salvador"); 
A Close Encounters of the Third Kind parody about refugees from an impoverished Central American country mistaking a Playboy magazine location scout and an American military invasion for extraterrestrials coming to save them ("Close Encounters of the Third World");
A Marx Brothers parody of Iran's revolution ("A Night in Tehran"); 
Palestinian radio DJs (played by Bruce Mahler and episode guest star George Carlin) broadcasting a morning show from a PLO bunker ("K.P.L.O"); 
A live-action Robert Altman Popeye movie parody with Popeye (Mark Blankfield) and a band of first-wave hippies fighting back against a fascist regime led by Bluto ("Popeye's Got a Brand New Bag"); 
The US Founding Fathers worrying that the Second Amendment ("The Right to Bear Arms") will be abused in the future while ignoring suggestions for amendments granting equal rights to women and African-Americans;
A variety show run by the Moral Majority featuring a magician who makes minorities disappear, a top ten list of things the Moral Majority hate, and a punk band performing bowdlerized hits for conservatives ("The Moral Majority Comedy Hour"); 
A parody of Altered States where Ronald Reagan (John Roarke) uses sensory deprivation and psychedelic mushrooms to find a way to bring America back to its glory days, but ends up transforming himself into Richard Nixon ("Altered Statesman");
A spaghetti western centered on the creationism vs. evolution argument featuring Don Novello as Father Guido Sarducci ("A Fist Full of Darwin"), and, 
In what is considered the show's magnum opus, a 17-minute parody of The Rocky Horror Picture Show with Ronald Reagan (John Roarke) as Tim Curry's Dr. Frank N. Furter creating the perfect Republican, who turns out to be a militant black man who leads Reagan's followers in a revolution.

Unusual for a sketch comedy series at the time, Fridays occasionally featured serious interludes and dramatic sketches, such as a segment that aired soon after the 1981 assassination attempt on Ronald Reagan involving all nine of the cast members recalling where they were at the time of previous assassinations and attempts and a sketch where a punk rocker (Michael Richards) visits his father (John Roarke) who rejects him by yelling, "Who are you?" and "I have no son!". After a long, heartfelt speech from the punk about how his father should accept that he is from a different generation and learn to love him, the punk discovers that the old man was right: they aren't father and son because they have different hair and eye colors.

From its inception, Fridays embraced the emerging new wave rock music scene and its associated culture to a greater extent than Saturday Night Live did at the time, widely incorporating it into their selection of musical guests, hosts and sketches. Unlike Saturday Night Live, Fridays did not have a show band on set. Pop art drawings were displayed and accompanied with a fuzz heavy electric guitar solo whenever the show went to and came back from commercial breaks, though season one featured cartoons by B. Kliban with some kind of pun as the punchline.

Three seasons of Fridays aired on ABC (see ). The last episode aired as a primetime sketch show. The show was originally 70 minutes in its first season. It was expanded to 90 minutes in seasons two and three.

SNL executive producer Dick Ebersol gave all Fridays cast members an offer to join Saturday Night Live in 1982, but most turned him down. Only Larry David, Kevin Kelton and Rich Hall worked on SNL for a short time after Fridays was completed (all of them worked on Saturday Night Live during its tenth season in 1984; Hall was a cast member while David and Kelton were writers).

Directors
Directors of Fridays include:

 Bob Bowker
 Tom Kramer
 Paul Miller
 John Moffitt

Producers
Producers of Fridays include:

 Jack Burns
 Bill Lee
 Pat Tourk Lee
 John Moffitt

Writers
Writers of Fridays include:

 Steve Adams
 Rod Ash
 Steve Barker
 Jack Burns
 Larry Charles
 Mark Curtiss
 Larry David
 Bryan Gordon
 Rich Hall
 Sam Hefter
 Kevin Kelton
 Bruce Kirschbaum
 Tom Kramer
 Bill Lee
 Bruce Mahler
 John Moffitt
 Matt Neuman
 Elaine Pope
 Fred Raker
 Michael Richards
 Sam Sandora
 Joe Shulkin

Performers
Main cast, guest stars and musical guests on Fridays include:

Main cast

 Mark Blankfield
 Maryedith Burrell
 Melanie Chartoff
 Larry David
 Rich Hall
 Darrow Igus
 Brandis Kemp
 Bruce Mahler
 Michael Richards
 John Roarke

Guest stars (seasons 2 and 3)

 Karen Allen
 Bob Balaban
 Valerie Bertinelli
 Beau Bridges
 George Carlin
 Billy Crystal
 Jamie Lee Curtis
 Shelley Duvall
 Marty Feldman
 Peter Fonda
 Genie Francis
 Anthony Geary
 Mark Hamill
 George Hamilton
 Valerie Harper
 Marilu Henner
 Gregory Hines
 Tab Hunter
 Madeline Kahn
 Andy Kaufman
 David L. Lander
 Michael McKean
 David Naughton
 Don Novello
 Victoria Principal
 Lynn Redgrave
 Howard E. Rollins Jr.
 Susan Sarandon
 William Shatner
 Brooke Shields
 David Steinberg
 Shelley Winters
 Henny Youngman

Musical guests

 AC/DC
 The Beach Boys
 Pat Benatar
 The Blasters
 Gary U.S. Bonds
 The Boomtown Rats
 Jack Bruce and Friends
 Jimmy Buffett and the Coral Reefer Band
 The Busboys
 Kim Carnes
 Jim Carroll
 The Cars
 Bill Champlin
 Chubby Checker
 The Clash
 Bruce Cockburn
 Devo
 Dire Straits
 The Eagles
 Steve Forbert
 The Four Tops
 Franke and the Knockouts
 Rory Gallagher
 David Grisman Quintet
 Heart
 Ian Hunter with Ellen Foley and Mick Ronson
 The Jam
 Al Jarreau
 Jefferson Starship
 Garland Jeffreys
 Journey
 King Crimson
 Kiss
 Kool & the Gang
 Huey Lewis and the News
 Kenny Loggins
 The Manhattan Transfer
 The Marshall Tucker Band
 Paul McCartney
 Randy Meisner and the Silverados
 Eddie Money
 Ted Nugent
 Graham Parker and The Rumour
 Tom Petty and the Heartbreakers
 The Plasmatics
 The Pretenders
 Quarterflash
 Bonnie Raitt
 REO Speedwagon
 Rockpile
 Boz Scaggs
 Scandal
 Sir Douglas Quintet
 Sister Sledge
 Split Enz
 The Stray Cats
 George Thorogood and the Destroyers
 The Tubes
 Billy Vera and The Beaters
 Stevie Wonder
 Warren Zevon
 Tommy Tutone

AC/DC, The Clash and The Stray Cats made their American television debuts on Fridays. At the time of The Stray Cats' appearance, the band had yet to be signed by a record company. During the group's performance, there was a crawl at the bottom of the screen inviting offers from record companies.

Episodes

Andy Kaufman incident
On the February 20, 1981, episode, Andy Kaufman was the host. During a sketch about couples at dinner sneaking away to the bathroom to smoke marijuana, Kaufman, who was known for causing trouble on live television, broke character and refused to read his lines (saying "I can't play stoned"). Michael Richards got up from the table, grabbed the cue cards and threw them down on the table in front of Kaufman, who responded by throwing a glass of water on Richards. Some of the show's cast and crew members (including Richards and Burns) became angry and a small brawl broke out on stage. Since the show was broadcast live, home viewers were able to see most of these events transpire until the network cut the cameras off. Kaufman returned the following week in a taped apology to home viewers. The incident was planned by Kaufman, who concocted it with his sidekick Bob Zmuda, and was meant as a prank. The only individuals aware of the plan were producer/director Moffitt, producer/announcer Burns, and the three comedians acting in the sketch along with Kaufman: Richards, Chartoff and Burrell. This incident was reenacted in the film Man on the Moon (1999), starring Jim Carrey as Kaufman, Zmuda as Burns, Norm Macdonald as Richards, Caroline Rhea as Chartoff and Mary Lynn Rajskub as Burrell.

Cancellation
The series ended in 1982 following ABC's decision to expand Nightline to five nights a week, which moved Fridays to air at midnight instead of 11:30pm.

One final attempt was made by ABC to save the show by putting it on in prime time. The episode (broadcast on April 23, 1982) was scheduled against Dallas, which did nothing to help the show's moribund ratings. The series was promptly canceled.

Syndication and DVD release
A few years after the show's cancellation, Fridays appeared in reruns on the USA Network in the late 1980s. However, the episodes were edited down to 60 minutes (similar to how Saturday Night Live is edited on cable reruns and NBC reruns that air at 10pm EST as filler). The reruns were pulled after a year.

For some time, a home video release of Fridays was considered out of the question, as cast member Michael Richards was said to have signed a deal stating that no episode would be released on any home video format. However, clips of sketches from the show (mostly sketches that featured Richards or David) surfaced on the Seinfeld season three DVD set in the bonus features set. Shout Factory announced plans to release all three seasons of the show on DVD in 2013. In August 2013, after missing their original release date, Shout Factory released a five disc best-of collection featuring highlights of 16 episodes from seasons one through three (not complete episodes). In 2015, Hulu Plus streamed select episodes from all three seasons (season one has episodes 1, 3, 8, and 10; season 2 has episodes 3, 7, 8, 9, 11, 12, 19, and 20; and season three has episodes 2, 4, 12, and 13). As of 2017, the show is no longer streaming on Hulu Plus, but the best-of DVD collection is still available for purchase, and the show's episodes (which include the Hulu episodes and some episodes that weren't featured on Hulu) can be streamed on Tubi TV and Shout! Factory.

References

External links

 
 Fridays TV Show: TV Party!
 Andy Kaufman Homepage -- Andy Hosts Fridays 

American Broadcasting Company original programming
1980s American late-night television series
1980s American satirical television series
1980s American sketch comedy television series
1980s American variety television series
American live television series
1980 American television series debuts
1982 American television series endings
English-language television shows
ABC late-night programming